All Saints’ Church, Yafforth, is a Grade II listed parish church in the Church of England in Yafforth, North Yorkshire.

History
The church dates from the twelfth century but was almost completely rebuilt in 1870 to designs by the architect James Pigott Pritchett of Darlington. A new east window was provided and designed by Clayton and Bell.

The rebuilt church was consecrated on 11 August 1870.

Parish status
The church is in a joint parish with
St Helen's Church, Ainderby Steeple
St Andrew's Church, Great Fencote
St Wilfrid's Church, Great Langton
St John the Baptist's Church, Kirby Wiske
St Mary's Church, Kirkby Fleetham
St Radegund's Church, Scruton

References

Yafforth
Yafforth